François Nicéphore Kakese Malela (born 11 May 1956 in Kifuza, Bandundu) is a politician in the Democratic Republic of the Congo. He is president of the Union pour le réveil et le développement du Congo (URDC) and was a candidate in the 2011 presidential election.

References

1956 births
Living people
People from Kwilu Province
Democratic Republic of the Congo politicians
Candidates for President of the Democratic Republic of the Congo
21st-century Democratic Republic of the Congo people